Macgowania is an extinct genus of parvipelvian ichthyosaur known from British Columbia of Canada.

History of research
Macgowania is known only from the holotype ROM 41992 (RBCM EH 91.2.5), a partial skeleton which preserved nearly complete skull, almost complete forefin and other postcranial elements. It was collected in the Jewitt Spur locality from the Pardonet Formation, dating to the middle Norian stage of the Late Triassic, about 210 million years ago. It was found on the northern shore of the Peace Reach branch of Williston Lake. A second specimen from the same locality, ROM 41991, may be referable to this genus based on its forefin structure, but this cannot be confirmed due to its poor preservation. Macgowania has a very stable position in many cladistic analyses. The family Macgowaniidae was named by McGowan and Motani in 2003 to include this genus.

Etymology
Macgowania was originally described by Chris McGowan in 1996 as Ichthyosaurus janiceps. It was reassigned to its own genus by Ryosuke Motani in 1999 and the type species is Macgowania janiceps. The generic name honors Chris McGowan for describing the type species. The specific name is said to derived from Janus, Latin for the Roman god with two opposite faces, and ceps, Latin for "with a head". The ~ceps suffix is derived from caput. Caput is Latin for head.

See also

 List of ichthyosaurs
 Timeline of ichthyosaur research

References

Late Triassic ichthyosaurs of North America
Triassic Canada
Fossils of British Columbia
Fossil taxa described in 1999
Ichthyosauromorph genera